Paul Tremo (–1810) was the head chef at the court of King Stanislaus Augustus Poniatowski of Poland. He was born in Berlin, in a family of French Huguenots. As the king's favourite cook, he was responsible for the culinary side of royal banquets, including Thursday Dinners to which Stanislaus Augustus invited Warsaw's leading intellectuals. He followed the king to Saint Petersburg after the latter's abdication in 1795, but returned to Warsaw after his death in 1798. His cooking style combined Polish, French and other west European influences. As a mentor to aspirant Polish chefs and author of recipes which circulated in handwritten copies, he was instrumental in the development of modern Polish cuisine that was more moderate and cosmopolitan than old Polish cookery.

Life 
Paul Tremo was born on 1 April 1733 or 1734 in Berlin as the middle son of Elie Tremeau and his wife, Louise Dinant. Elie's father, of the same name, was a Huguenot from the French province of Poitou, who at the turn of the 18th century fled religious persecution in France following the Edict of Fontainebleau and settled in Berlin, encouraged by the Edict of Potsdam. Both Paul Tremo's father and grandfather worked in cotton processing, but two of Elie Junior's sons – the eldest Jacques (1729–1788) and Paul – chose to pursue their careers as cooks. Their family name is variously noted in Berlin church records as Tremeau, Treinau or Tremon, but Jacques and Paul Polonized its spelling to Tremo upon their migration to the Polish–Lithuanian Commonwealth.

In 1762, Paul Tremo landed a job as a court chef to Stanisław Poniatowski, a Polish aristocrat and titular grand pantler of Lithuania. Two years later, in 1764, Poniatowski was elected and crowned king of Poland, taking the regnal name Stanislaus Augustus. Of all chefs working at the court, it was Paul Tremo who enjoyed the status of the king's favourite cook, accompanying him in all his travels. This status can be inferred from his salary compared with those of his colleagues; in 1795, he received a payment of 902.15 florins, while two other royal master chefs earned 560 and 144 florins, respectively.

Tremo lived in apartments at the Royal Castle of Warsaw and in the Royal Baths Park. Additionally, in 1789, as a token of royal favour, Tremo was given a manor house in the Warsaw suburb of Grzybów (now the part of Warsaw in the vicinity of Grzybowski Square). While Jacques Tremo was married with at least one daughter and two sons, both of whom served in Polish military formations, Paul Tremo remained single and childless. At home, he employed a female cook who prepared simple meals for him, as he never consumed the dishes he concocted at work.

Following Stanislaus Augustus's abdication brought about by the Third Partition of Poland in 1795, Tremo accompanied the former king to his exile in Grodno and then in Saint Petersburg. After Poniatowski's death in 1798, Tremo declined a job offer from Emperor Paul I of Russia on the pretext of travelling to a spa for health reasons and returned to Warsaw. He died in 1810 in his Grzybów manor and was buried at an unknown location in the cemetery of the Evangelical Reformed (Calvinist) Church in Warsaw.

Work 

Tremo gained Poniatowski's trust as the cook able to satisfy both his palate and his dietary requirements. The teetotal king suffered from gastric ailments from an early age. He usually started his day with a cup of hot chocolate or bouillon. His favourite dish was roast or stewed mutton, which he washed down with spring water. Tremo often consulted royal menus with the court physician and occasionally prepared separate dishes specifically for the king to accommodate his sensitive stomach. Tomatoes, for example, were considered detrimental to the monarch's health and were never used in Tremo's recipes.

In the royal kitchen, Tremo oversaw all stages of meal preparation, from procuring ingredients to composing menus, directing the work of cooks and kitchen boys, to personally seasoning the dishes before serving. To broaden his culinary knowledge, he studied classic cookbooks, such as the ancient Roman Apicius, and also set out on international learning trips, which familiarized him with contemporary German, French and English cooking practices. He introduced novel French flavours and cooking techniques to Polish cuisine, making it lighter and more moderate in the use of fat, sugar, vinegar, salt and expensive exotic spices. His repertoire combined old Polish dishes with French specialities. At royal banquets, such as the Thursday Dinners to which Stanislaus Augustus invited Warsaw's leading intellectuals, he served the king's favourite mutton, cold cuts, as well as game bird dishes, such as larded hazel grouse, wood grouse with red cabbage or black grouse with braised beetroots.

In Warsaw, Tremo enjoyed the reputation of being one of the finest chefs in Europe. However, some of his contemporaries complained that his meats were too tough, his sauces too heavy, and his idea of west European culinary trends not always up-to-date. British traveller Elizabeth Craven could not conceal her amusement when, at a banquet given by the Polish king, she was served meat and fish doused generously with melted butter, supposedly in the English style. German-Polish traveller Georg Forster was surprised when a peasant boy whom he had given Tremo's almond cake, did not enjoy the treat.

Tremo wrote at least two books in Polish, which he failed to publish during his lifetime. His  (Kitchen Botany), about the culinary uses of various vegetables, fruits and herbs, has not survived. The other was a cookbook with about 86 recipes, which was widely circulated in manuscript copies, at least two of which have been preserved. One of them, which bears a long, Baroque title translating as The exact study of the methods of cooking and preparing dishes of meat, fish, vegetables, flour, as well as seasoning of various sauces, making punch essence, etc., contains the author's humorous motto, "not everyone thinks, but everyone eats." Both copies were published in 1991 in two independent editions.

He also influenced the development of modern Polish cuisine by helping raise the next generation of Polish chefs, many of whom worked with him as apprentices. Tremo's and his brother's signatures can be found on a master craftsman's diploma issued in Warsaw in 1783. One of Tremo's apprentices was Jan Szyttler, who went on to become a prolific food writer, best known for his  (Hunter's Cuisine); published in 1845, it is the first Polish cookbook devoted solely to game dishes.

Publications 
Tremo's cookbook has been published posthumously in two independent editions, based on two surviving manuscript copies, in the following volumes:

Notes

References

Sources 
 
 
 
 
 
 
 

1730s births
1810 deaths
Cookbook writers
French chefs
German chefs
Polish chefs
Polish food writers